Palatrussardi, later known as PalaVobis, PalaTucker, Mazda Palace and PalaSharp, was an indoor arena located in Milan, Italy. The seating capacity was 8,479 and it hosted concerts and sporting events. It was built in 1985 to replace two pre-existing structures, the Sport Palace and the Palatenda.

The arena hosted the 1987 Basketball Intercontinental Cup in which local Philips Milano defeated FC Barcelona and won the competition.

Entertainment events

Naming right history
When opened in 1986, it was named after Nicola Trussardi, a local fashion designer and entrepreneur.

Other naming rights deals included computer company Vobis (1996–2002), automobile emissions control company Tucker and Mazda automotive manufacturer.

The arena was lastly under an agreement with Sharp electronics corporation, in effect since 2007.

Gallery

2026 Winter Olympics 
It is one of two venues to be used for ice hockey, along with PalaItalia Santa Giulia.

References

External links
Official site

Defunct sports venues in Italy
Sports venues in Milan
Defunct basketball venues
Venues of the 2026 Winter Olympics